Krzysztof Jabłoński (born 30 September 1977 in Gniezno, Poland) is a Polish speedway rider has won European Champion titles and was a member of the Polish national team.

In October 2008, he joined the Lakeside Hammers speedway team in the UK, during their injury crisis.

His brother, Mirosław (b. 1985) is also a speedway rider.

Career

Individual U-21 World Championship
1998 - 2nd place (14 points +2)

Individual European Championship
2004 - 6th  place (9 points)
2006 - European Champion (13 points +3)

European Pairs Championship
2007 - 2nd place (12 points)

Polish Pairs Speedway Championship
1998 - 3rd place

Polish Under-21 Pairs Championship
1998 - 2nd place

Polish Under-21 Team Championship
1998 - 2nd place

Silver Helmet (U-21)
1998 - 3rd place

See also
Poland national speedway team

External links
(en) (pl) Official Website

1977 births
Living people
Polish speedway riders
Individual Speedway European Champions
People from Gniezno
Sportspeople from Greater Poland Voivodeship